The Pig-Basket atrocity is a war crime that took place during WWII in which Allied prisoners were thrown into the sea. This atrocity was committed by Japanese soldiers in Indonesia.

The Atrocity 
After the Allied forces surrendered East Java to the Japanese, 200 Allied soldiers fled to the hills around Malang and formed resistance groups. Eventually, the soldiers were captured by the Kenpeitai, and squeezed into 3-foot long bamboo baskets used for transporting pigs. The men were then thrown into the back of open transport trucks that drove them through the countryside in 38 °C weather. The trucks took them to a railway where they were unloaded and then transported again, this time in open rail wagons to the coast. 15 years old at the time, Elizabeth van Kempen observed this transport with her father while standing on the nearby ridge of Mount Semeru. Elizabeth recalls hearing the men's screams from where she stood. Her father was killed years later by the Kenpeitai in Malang for hiding weapons.

By the time they reached their destination, the Allied Soldiers were half dead with dehydration and heat stroke and likely in great pain from their tightly confined state. They were loaded onto fishing boats and sailed out to shark-infested waters off Surabaya where the men were dumped, still in the baskets, into the ocean.

The aftermath 
The commander in chief of the Japanese forces in Java at the time was lieutenant-general Hitoshi Imamura.

Imamura and his troops were detained by the Australian Army in Rabaul for committing war crimes including the execution of allied prisoners of war. Imamura wrote to the Australian Commander in Rabaul  to ask that his own trial be expedited in order to speed up the prosecution of the soldiers under his command. He was tried by an Australian military tribunal on May 1st - 16th 1947 and convicted of charges including “unlawfully [disregarding and failing] to discharge his duty...to control the members of his command, whereby they committed brutal atrocities and other high crimes.”. His sentence was imprisonment for 10 years and he was sent to Tokyo's Sugamo prison where he stayed until his release in 1954.

References 

Japanese war crimes
World War II prisoner of war massacres